

Episodes

Season 22 (2020)

Season 23 (2021)

Season 24 (2022)

References

 
Lists of American reality television series episodes